Seven Days in May is an American political thriller novel by Fletcher Knebel and Charles W. Bailey II, first published in hardcover by Harper & Row in 1962.

The plot concerns an attempted military coup in the United States.

Reception
The book was a great success, and was number one on The New York Times bestseller list for the weeks of November 18, 1962, December 2–9, 1962, and March 3, 1963 (the weeks of December 16 to February 24 were not listed due to the 1962–63 New York City newspaper strike). It was made into a successful American movie, also named Seven Days in May, in 1964, as well as into a Soviet three-episode miniseries, named "The conspiracy", in 1971 and four-episode miniseries, named , in 1983.

Awards
The novel was nominated for the 1989 Prometheus Hall of Fame Award.

See also
 Mount Weather, which was mentioned in the novel
 Patriot Freeway, which was formerly the 'War road' (the dirt road mentioned at the beginning of the novel)

References

1962 American novels
American novels adapted into films
American political novels
American thriller novels
Fiction set in 1974
Harper & Row books
Novels about coups d'état
Political thriller novels